Jennifer Leigh McClellan (born December 28, 1972) is an American politician and attorney who has served as the U.S. representative for Virginia's 4th congressional district since 2023. A member of the Democratic Party, she represented the 9th district in the Virginia State Senate from 2017 to 2023 and the 71st district in the Virginia House of Delegates from 2009 to 2017. She ran in the Democratic primary for governor of Virginia in the 2021 election, losing to former governor Terry McAuliffe. 

McClellan was the Democratic nominee in the 2023 Virginia's 4th congressional district special election, and defeated Republican nominee Leon Benjamin with 74.2% of the vote. She is the first Black woman elected to Congress from Virginia.

Early life and education
McClellan was born in Petersburg, Virginia. Her father, James Fennimore McClellan Jr., was a professor at Virginia State University, where her mother, Lois Dedeaux McClellan, also worked as a counselor. Both her parents were involved in civil rights activism. She attended Matoaca High School in Chesterfield County, where she was valedictorian. She earned a Bachelor of Arts in English and political science from the University of Richmond in 1994, and a Juris Doctor from the University of Virginia School of Law in 1997.

Early career

After law school, McClellan began practicing law at Hunton & Williams. She has also worked as regulatory counsel for Verizon Communications.

Virginia House of Delegates 
In 2005, she ran for office for the first time, seeking the Virginia House of Delegates seat vacated by Viola Baskerville, who stepped down to run for lieutenant governor of Virginia. McClellan won the election and from 2006 to 2017 represented the 71st district in the House of Delegates, which comprised parts of the city of Richmond and Henrico County.

McClellan has served as vice chair of the Democratic Party of Virginia. As the highest-ranking female party officer, she was also automatically a member of the Democratic National Committee (DNC). As a DNC member, she was a superdelegate to the 2008 Democratic National Convention. She has also served as vice chair of the Virginia Legislative Black Caucus and became the first pregnant Virginia delegate to participate in a legislative session. 

McClellan was an outspoken critic of Governor Bob McDonnell's efforts to overhaul Virginia's pension system in 2012. She opposed the cuts to retirement benefits for teachers and public safety employees, and argued that Republican lawmakers had rushed the legislation to minimize any scrutiny from Democrats and labor unions.

Virginia Senate 
McClellan was elected to the Virginia Senate in a special election on January 10, 2017, to fill the 9th district seat vacated by Donald McEachin's election to the U.S. House of Representatives. She defeated Libertarian Party nominee Corey Fauconier. In the race, she was endorsed by McEachin, as well as Richmond Mayor Levar Stoney, U.S. Senators Tim Kaine and Mark Warner, and Governor Terry McAuliffe. Her seat was once held by former governor Douglas Wilder.

In 2019, McClellan co-sponsored the Repeal Act, which would have lifted some of Virginia's restrictions on abortion. In 2020, she introduced legislation to help end the school-to-prison pipeline by training school resource officers in adolescent psychology. She has also sponsored the Virginia Clean Economy Act and the Voting Rights Act of Virginia, both of which were signed into law. She called the passage of the Voting Rights Act "a huge victory for our democracy. While other states are threatening voting rights, Virginia took a major step today to protect the right to vote." She led the commissioning of the Emancipation and Freedom Monument, which was installed on Brown's Island in September 2021.

2021 gubernatorial campaign

In June 2020, McClellan announced her candidacy for governor of Virginia in 2021. In a Democratic primary debate at Virginia State University, she called herself a "nominee who will excite and expand our base. I’ve spent 31 years building this party and electing Democrats at the local, state and national level. It’s not enough to give someone something to vote against. We’ve got to give people something to vote for." Her campaign was attacked by Senate colleague Amanda Chase, who claimed that McClellan's leadership role in the Legislative Black Caucus disqualified her from representing all Virginians as governor (Chase was later censured for her racist remark, among other controversies). 

Former governor Terry McAuliffe, whose transition team McClellan led when he was elected in 2013, won the nomination, with former state delegate Jennifer Carroll Foy taking a distant second place and McClellan not far behind in third. McAuliffe went on to narrowly lose the general election to Republican nominee Glenn Youngkin. Had either McClellan or Carroll Foy won the election, she would have become the first female governor of Virginia, the second Black governor of Virginia after Douglas Wilder, and the first Black female U.S. governor.

U.S. House of Representatives

2023 special election

McClellan was the Democratic nominee in the 2023 special election for Virginia's 4th congressional district; the seat became vacant when incumbent Donald McEachin died from colorectal cancer on November 28, 2022. She won a firehouse primary on December 20, 2022, then defeated pastor Leon Benjamin in the general election on February 21, 2023. She is the first Black woman elected to Congress from Virginia. She was sworn in on March 7, 2023.

Committee assignments 

 Committee on Armed Services
 Committee on Science, Space, and Technology

Personal life
McClellan married David Mills on November 15, 2008. Her mentor, Tim Kaine, officiated the wedding ceremony. She and her husband live in Richmond with their two children. She is a Presbyterian.

Electoral history

See also 
 List of African-American United States representatives
 Women in the United States House of Representatives

References

External links

 Congresswoman Jennifer McClellan official U.S. House website
 Jennifer McClellan for Congress campaign website
 Legislative profile at the Virginia General Assembly

|-

|-

|-

1972 births
20th-century African-American women
21st-century African-American politicians
21st-century American politicians
21st-century African-American women
21st-century American women lawyers
21st-century American lawyers
21st-century American women politicians
African-American Christians
African-American members of the United States House of Representatives
African-American state legislators in Virginia
African-American women in politics
African-American women lawyers
American Presbyterians
Candidates in the 2021 United States elections
Democratic National Committee people
Democratic Party members of the United States House of Representatives from Virginia
Democratic Party members of the Virginia House of Delegates
Democratic Party Virginia state senators
Female members of the United States House of Representatives
Living people
Politicians from Richmond, Virginia
Presbyterians from Virginia
University of Richmond alumni
University of Virginia School of Law alumni
Verizon Communications people
Virginia lawyers
Women state legislators in Virginia